Omphalepia dujardini is a species of snout moth in the genus Omphalepia. It is known from Madagascar (the type location is Andranomena).

References

Moths described in 1967
Epipaschiinae
Moths of Madagascar
Moths of Africa